Richard Turnbull may refer to:
 Richard Turnbull (theologian)
 Richard Turnbull (colonial administrator)
 Richard Turnbull (politician)